M1909 may refer to:

 Hotchkiss M1909 Benét-Mercié machine gun
 Skoda M1909 machine gun
 M1909 revolver - a Colt pistol
 152 mm howitzer M1909/30 - A Russian artillery piece
 122 mm howitzer M1909/37 - A Russian artillery piece
 14-inch gun M1909 - A US Army artillery piece